Conus pelagicus is an extinct species of sea snail, a marine gastropod mollusk in the family Conidae, the cone snails, cone shells or cones.

Description
The length of this conical shell is 54 mm. It has a rather elevated spire with 12 inclined whorls, some of which are somewhat rounded. The shell is covered with tawny circular spots and a few longitudinal corrugated, marbling streaks.

Distribution
This marine species of cone snail has only been found as a fossil in the Pleistocene, Pliocene and Miocene of Europe.

References

 1840, Grateloup. Conchyliologie Fossile des Terrains Tertiares du Bassin de, Upper Miocene.
 1856, Hoernes. Abh.K.K.Geol.Reichsanstalt 3, Upper Miocene.
 1868, Foresti. Catalogo Moll.Foss.Plioc.Coline Bolognesi, Upper Pliocene.
 1910, Cerulli-Irelli. Paleont.Ital.16 p. 48(240)ff., Upper Pliocene.
 1955, Rossi-Ronchetti. Rivista Italiana di Paleontologia e Stratigrafia Mem.5 pt, Upper Pliocene.
 1960, Glibert. Mem.Inst.R.Sci.Nat.Belg.ser.2fasc.64 p. 91ff., Upper Pliocene.
 1960, Glibert. Mem.Inst.R.Sci.Nat.Belg.2nd ser.,fasc.64 p. 91ff., Upper Pliocene.
 1997, Chirli. Malacofauna Pliocenica Toscana, 1:7; pl. 1, fig. 17; pl. 2, fig. 1-5., Upper Pliocene.
 1997, Chirli. Malacofauna Pliocenica Toscana, 1:7; pl. 1, fig. 17; pl. 2, fig. 1-5., Upper Pleistocene.

External links
 Conus Biodiversity Website: Conus kahiko

pelagicus